Diego Daniel Medina Roman (born 13 January 2002) is a Bolivian footballer who plays as a centre-back for the Bolivian club Always Ready and the Bolivia national team.

Career
Medina is a youth product of the academy of Tahuichi FC since the age of 8. He moved to Always Ready in 2021, and began his senior career in the Bolivian Primera División.

International career
Medina debuted with the Bolivia national team in a 2–0 friendly loss to Senegal on 24 September 2022.

References

External links
 
 

Living people
2002 births
Sportspeople from Santa Cruz de la Sierra
Bolivian footballers
Bolivia international footballers
Club Always Ready players
Bolivian Primera División players
Association football defenders